Astro Wheel, Astro Wheels, or AstroWheel may refer to:

Amusement rides
 Astro Wheel (Chance Rides), a 1967 Ferris wheel
 AstroWheel (Great Escape), a 1969 attraction in Queensbury, New York
 AstroWheel (Six Flags AstroWorld), a 1968 double Ferris wheel in Houston, Texas

People
 Astro Wheels, an alias of American astronaut Douglas Harry "Wheels" Wheelock